Jono Basanavičiaus Street is a central street in Palanga, the most popular and biggest summer resort in Lithuania. It is named after Jonas Basanavičius, the chairman of the session that adopted the Act of Independence of Lithuania, who personally visited Palanga in 1924.

The pedestrian street has many restaurants, coffeehouses, entertainment facilities and lead to the Palanga Pier and Palanga Beach, thus it is exceptionally popular among tourists.

For the sake of safety of pedestrians, the riding with bicycles and scooters is prohibited in the street in summer (from June 1 to September 1).

Gallery

References

Streets in Palanga